III Riigikogu was the third legislature of the Estonian Parliament (Riigikogu). The legislature was elected after 1926 elections (held on 15–17 May 1926). It sat between 15 June 1926 and 14 June 1929, before the next round of elections were held.

Parties and seats

Officers 
The following is a list of the Riigikogu's officers during the third legislative session:

Chairman 
Karl Einbund, from 22 June 1926

First Assistant Chairman 
Mihkel Martna, from 22 June 1926

Second Assistant Chairman 
Rudolf Penno, from 22 June 1926

Secretary 
Mihkel Juhkam, 22 June 1926 – 6 December 1928

August Tamman, from 11 December 1928

First Assistant Secretary 
Karl-Ferdinand Kornel, 22 June 1926 – 23 July 1926

Oskar Karl Johann Liigand, from 23 July 1926

Second Assistant Secretary 
Jaan Piiskar, from 22 June 1926

Members of the Riigikogu

References

Riigikogu